Tonje Refsnes (born 13 November 1994) is a Norwegian handball player for Vipers Kristiansand.

Achievements
EHF Champions League:
Winner: 2020/2021
Bronze medalist: 2018/2019
EHF Cup:
Finalist: 2017/2018
Norwegian League:
Winner: 2017/2018, 2018/2019, 2019/2020, 2020/2021
Silver medalist: 2016/2017
Norwegian Cup:
Winner: 2017, 2018, 2019, 2020, 2022/23

References
 

1994 births
Living people
People from Evje og Hornnes
Norwegian female handball players
Sportspeople from Agder